Elections were held in Simcoe County, Ontario on October 22, 2018 in conjunction with municipal elections across the province.

Simcoe County Council
The county council consists of the mayors and deputy mayors of the municipalities.

Adjala-Tosorontio

Mayor

Bradford West Gwillimbury

Due to technical delays with internet voting, the voting period in Bradford West Gwillimbury was extended to October 23.

Mayor

Clearview

Mayor

Collingwood

Due to technical delays with internet voting, the voting period in Collingwood was extended to October 23.

Mayor

Essa

Mayor

Innisfil
Due to technical delays with internet voting, the voting period in Innisfil was extended to October 23.

Mayor

Deputy mayor

Innisfil Town Council

Source for unofficial results:

Midland

Mayor

New Tecumseth

Mayor

Oro-Medonte

Mayor

Penetanguishene
Due to technical delays with internet voting, the voting period in Pentetanguishene was extended to October 23.

Mayor

Source:

Ramara

Mayor

Severn

Mayor

Springwater

Mayor

Tay

Mayor

Tiny

Mayor

Wasaga Beach

Mayor

References

Simcoe
Simcoe County